Women of Valor is a 1986 American made-for-television war drama film about World War II directed by Buzz Kulik and starring Susan Sarandon and Kristy McNichol. It premiered on CBS on November 23, 1986 and was released on DVD on March 10, 1998.

Plot
A group of American Army nurses are captured by the Japanese in April 1942. They are marched along with American soldiers as part of the Bataan Death March. They are put in a prisoner-of-war camp in Bataan, where they spend nearly three years.

The story focuses on Lt. Margaret Ann "Maggie" Jessup, the head army nurse who survived the camp and testified against the Japanese. She lobbied for awards of valor to be given to the women prisoners, in front of the United States Congressional subcommittee years later as a colonel.

Cast
 Susan Sarandon as 1LT/C Margaret Ann Jessup
 Kristy McNichol as T.J. Nolan
 Alberta Watson as 2LT Helen Prescott
 Valerie Mahaffey as 2LT Katherine R. Grace
Suzanne Lederer as 2LT Gail Polson
Patrick Bishop as Captain Matome Nakayama
 Terry O'Quinn as MAJ Tom Patterson
 Neva Patterson as Lady Judith Eason
 Jay Acovone as CPT Rader

Criticism
The film was generally negatively received. One of the main criticisms was that it was not realistic. The cast was also criticized for retaining their looks while trying to survive in poor conditions. The New York Times stated the story should have given more attention to the people rather than the situations.

References

External links

1986 television films
1986 films
Pacific War films
World War II prisoner of war films
1980s war drama films
Films directed by Buzz Kulik
Films scored by Georges Delerue
Films set in the Philippines
CBS network films
Bataan Death March
Films shot in the Philippines
Films set in 1942
Films set in 1943
Films set in 1944
Films set in 1945
1980s English-language films